The 1987 Soviet Chess Championship was the 54th edition of USSR Chess Championship. Held from 3-29 March 1987 in Minsk. The title was won by Alexander Beliavsky. Semifinals took place in Sevastopol and Pinsk; two First League tournaments (also qualifying to the final) was held at Kuibyshev e Irkutsk.

Qualifying

Semifinals 
Semifinals took place at Sevastopol e Pinsk in August 1986.

First League 
Top six qualified for the final.

Final

Play-off

References 

USSR Chess Championships
1987 in chess
1987 in Soviet sport